Pappu Kalani (born c. 1951) is an Indian criminal-politician from Ulhasnagar. After emerging as the leader of an organized crime
syndicate in the 1980s, he was elected president of the Ulhasnagar municipal council in 1986. He was elected to Maharashtra Vidhan Sabha in 1990 elections as Indian National Congress candidate from Ulhasnagar (Vidhan Sabha constituency). He won 1995 and 1999 assembly elections as Independent. He won two elections in the period 1992–2001 when he was in jail on murder charges. He was elected from Ulhasnagar again in 2004 as a member of RPI (Athavale) group.  His formal name is Suresh Budharmal Kalani and Pappu may be a nickname, though he prefers it as part of the formal name, writing Suresh (Pappu) Budharmal Kalani in his election papers.

He is currently on bail in 19 cases including eight of murder and was most recently elected the MLA for Ulhasnagar from the Republican Party of India (Athavale) in the 2004 Maharashtra state assembly elections.

Pappu Kalani served a life sentence on 3 December 2013 in a 23-yr-old murder case of Ghanashyam Bhatija. Ghanashyam Bhatija was murdered on 27 February 1990 near the Pinto Resorts in Ulhasnagar of Thane district. His brother Inder Bhatija, who had seen the murder, was also shot dead on 27 April 1999 despite having police protection.

Life and career
Born into a wealthy family, Pappu Kalani's uncle Dunichand Kalani was the president of the local unit of Indian National Congress. The family ran a liquor business and owned a number of distilleries and hotels. In the 1970s, Ulhasnagar was a booming lawless town settled by entrepreneurial refugees who had emigrated from Sindh, Pakistan after the Partition of India in 1947. Sharp business practices (Ulhasnagar was known for its "duplicate"s or forged goods) combined with illegal construction and unauthorised industrial units made for an atmosphere where "protection" emerged as a profitable business.

A number of gangs were soon working under the patronage of political parties. Pappu Kalani's uncle Keemat Kalani, also affiliated with the Congress party, ran the gang headed by Chiman Tejwani, while the opposing parties, under politician Gop Behrani, employed the gang of Govind Vachani and Gopal Rajwani. It is reported that both gangs were connected to the Dawood Ibrahim gang. They also use media effectively, and hush money were regularly paid to journalists.

In 1983, Gopal Rajwani was for a while aligned with Pappu Kalani, and they executed the brutal knife murder of the
editor A V Narayan of Blitz magazine. Rajwani was
arrested for this, but he was eventually acquitted due to lack of witnesses
and shoddy prosecution. Nothing came out of this dastardly murder however as the Indian press
never stood up against this criminal.

In 1986, Pappu Kalani was elected president of the Ulhasnagar Municipal Council (UMC),
and the same year, he was chosen by the Indian National Congress party as
its candidate for the state legislature from
Ulhasnagar, and easily won the
seat.

Meanwhile, Gopal Rajwani and Pappu had fallen out
over the division of extortion money.
In April 1985, Rajwani was arrested in an extortion case, apparently at
Kalani's
bidding.   As Rajwani
was being escorted to the police station in a rickshaw, Kalani
arranged for his men to attack him with bombs and guns. Rajwani survived the
attack and eventually relocated to Dubai, with the help of Haji Mastan, a
notorious smuggler and senior don of that time.

In April 1989, Pappu's uncle Dudhichand Kalani was murdered, allegedly by the
Govind Vachani / Gopal Rajwani gang, at the
instance of Gop Behrani. This led to reprisal killings – as many as 22 murders in five
months. It was said during this period that
"there would be a killing in Ulhasnagar every Tuesday."
It was during this period that Pappu Kalani emerged as the leader of his own
organized crime gang.

Bhathija, Anna, and Jadhav murders 

In February and April 1990, nephews of Gop Behrani, Ghanashyam and Inder Bhateja were
shot dead, despite having been given state police protection. Also shot dead in 1990 were gangster Anna,
and rickshaw union leader and bodyguard of Rajwani, Maruti Jadhav, both of whom were
affiliated with the Gopal Rajwani gang. Jadhav in his dying declaration, as well as another person who was injured in the revolver attack, identified Pappu Kalani personally, and he would later be refused bail in
this murder case.

In 1990, when Pappu Kalani was formally named in some of these murders, he was expelled from the Congress party.

In 1992, when the clean-imaged Sudhakarrao Naik took over as Chief
Minister from Sharad Pawar,
he launched a drive against criminal-politicians. Media pressure increased tremendously after the September 1992 shootout where Dawood Ibrahim's gang killed Shailesh Haldankar of the Arun Gawli gang as well as several on-duty policemen at Mumbai's JJ Hospital. Thereafter,
Pappu Kalani were arrested in November 1992, along with some others gangsters. Pappu was charged with
the gang murders from 1990 and with the JJ Hospital shootout-ably executed by D-Company's Shyam Kishore Garikapatti alias "Black Scorpion"; a total of 19 cases were filed against him.
Several appeals against his incarceration failed – the court
found him sufficiently implicated in the Maruti Jadhav murder to label him as However, TADA laws were found inappropriate in some other charges –
particularly for both the Bhateja murders, and also
in the JJ Hospital shootout case, which were transferred to a sessions court. However, none of these cases progressed to trial.
Altogether, he spent nine years in jail under TADA before being eventually released on
bail in 2002.

At one point, Sudhakarrao made a statement that the state leader of Indian National Congress party and erstwhile Chief Minister Sharad Pawar, had asked him to
"go easy on Pappu Kalani".
At another time,
Chief Minister Manohar Joshi of Shiv Sena announced his
intention to prosecute criminal-politicians, but political realities ensured that nothing much was done.

Under Indian law, someone who has not been sentenced to more
than two years for a crime cannot be considered guilty of a major crime and
is free to
fight elections. Thus, despite being in jail, Kalani kept fighting
and winning the assembly seat from Ulhasnagar, partly because of the
family's muscle, but also because in his first term, Kalani had worked
to improve the roads and the water supply.

In 1999, when his mentor Sharad Pawar formed the National Congress Party, Pappu
also joined it. However, mounting public pressure proved disruptive for the
nascent party and he was forced to resign. At this time, he handed over the Municipal
corporation to his wife Jyoti Kalani, who would also soon be arrested on
charges
of forgery, non-payment of revenue and illegal liquor manufacturing.

Rajwani murder

Meanwhile, in January 2000, arch rival Gopal Rajwani was shot dead in a hail
of bullets as he was coming out of a car at the magistrate's court to attend
a case. It was widely believed that Pappu Kalani, at the time still in jail,
may have masterminded it.

Immediately after his release from jail in 2001, several cases arose where he
allegedly tried to intimidate one Bhoir family, part of whose land had been illegally encroached upon to build the Seema Holiday Home (since demolished) owned by the Kalanis, and also the shopowner Ramesh Rohra.

In 2004, Pappu Kalani again won the assembly elections, as a candidate of the
Republican Party of India (Athavale). His wife however,
continues to be with the National Congress Party.

In 2005, the Bombay High Court ordered the demolition of 855 illegal
structures in Ulhasnagar, Pappu Kalani, a large part of whose extortion money depended on
permitting illegal constructions, passed a law permitting most of them to be
legalized. However, many structures did not even pay the legalization fees, and
large scale demolitions were launched in Ulhasnagar for most of 2006.

In the municipal elections of 2007, despite very little electioneering by
opposing groups, Pappu Kalani's group mustered only 15 seats (out of 76),
and it is thought that the influence of musclepower may have waned
considerably in Ulhasnagar.

Family
Pappu Kalani's wife Jyoti Kalani emerged on her own during the years when he
was out of power or in prison, becoming the president (mayor) of the powerful Ulhasnagar
Municipal Council. In recent years, she too faced several charges of intimidation and forgery, and lost the 2007 municipal elections. His son
Omi Kalani has been named in several extortion and assault cases in 2005, and he also has a daughter Seema.

In 2004, his brother Narayan Kalani was arrested for three murders dating back to the
internecine gang warfare of 1990.

References

Maharashtra MLAs 1990–1995
Maharashtra MLAs 1995–1999
Maharashtra MLAs 1999–2004
Maharashtra MLAs 2004–2009
Sindhi people
Indian crime bosses
Indian politicians convicted of crimes
Living people
1951 births
People from Ulhasnagar
Politicians convicted of murder
Criminals from Maharashtra
Republican Party of India (Athawale) politicians
Indian National Congress politicians